Armstrong and Miller – later retitled The Armstrong and Miller Show – is a comedy sketch television show that aired between 1997 and 2001 featuring Alexander Armstrong and Ben Miller, known together as Armstrong and Miller. Following a series on the Paramount Comedy Channel in 1997, a further three were made for Channel 4.

The duo moved to BBC One in 2007 with The Armstrong & Miller Show.

Production
Four series were produced by Absolutely Productions. The first series was made for the Paramount Comedy Channel, the subsequent three series were broadcast on Channel 4 (Series 2 was also repeated on Paramount). The title was Armstrong and Miller for the first two series, and The Armstrong and Miller Show for the last two.

DVD release
Only series 4 has been released on DVD.

Chronology

References

External links
 
 Official Armstrong & Miller Site

1990s British television sketch shows
2000s British television sketch shows
1997 British television series debuts
2001 British television series endings
British television sketch shows
Channel 4 comedy
English-language television shows
Channel 4 sketch shows
Armstrong and Miller